Milton Moore (1884–1956) was an American cinematographer of the silent era. He also worked on several screenplays. He collaborated a number of times with the director Dallas M. Fitzgerald.

Selected filmography
 Love's Lariat (1916)
 The Vanishing Dagger (1920)
 Don't Get Personal (1922)
 The Guttersnipe (1922)
 Daughters of Today (1924)
 The Tomboy (1924)
 He Who Gets Slapped (1924)
 Passionate Youth (1925)
 Stella Maris (1925)
 The Goose Woman (1925)
 Josselyn's Wife (1926)
 That Model from Paris (1926)
 College Days (1926)
 Sin Cargo (1926)
 Redheads Preferred (1926)
 Lost at Sea (1926)
 The Earth Woman (1926)
 One Hour of Love (1927)
 Wilful Youth (1927)
 Out of the Past (1927)
 Web of Fate (1927)
 Woman's Law (1927)
 The First Night (1927)
 The Rose of Kildare (1927)
 The Girl He Didn't Buy (1928)
 Golden Shackles (1928)
 Maizie (1933)

References

Bibliography
 Munden, Kenneth White. The American Film Institute Catalog of Motion Pictures Produced in the United States, Part 1. University of California Press, 1997.

External links

1884 births
1956 deaths
American cinematographers
People from Indiana
20th-century American screenwriters